Jordan Thomas Berry (born 18 March 1991) is an Australian professional American football punter who is a free agent. He played college football at Eastern Kentucky.

Early life
Berry was born in Melbourne, Victoria, Australia. However he was moved to Brisbane, Queensland at a young age with his father. He played junior Australian rules football with Sherwood Districts Australian Football Club from the Under 9s (2000) to under 12s (2004) before returning to Melbourne with his family.

In Melbourne, Berry played under 18s football with the Aberfeldie Football Club in the Essendon District Football League. He also played with the Calder Cannons in the TAC Cup, a feeder club for the Australian Football League. Realising that he may not make the grade in the AFL, but in possession of a booming kick, he joined Prokick Australia and was signed on a scholarship to the US.

College career
Berry played college football for Eastern Kentucky from 2009 to 2013. In 2010, he was named to the All-OVC second-team and the OVC All-Newcomer team. In 2011, Berry was named to the All-OVC first-team. In 2013, he was named to the All-OVC second-team.

Professional career

Pittsburgh Steelers
Berry was signed by the Pittsburgh Steelers on April 14, 2015. After a preseason in which he punted 19 times for an average of 49.8 yards per punt, the Steelers traded incumbent punter Brad Wing to the New York Giants.

On February 1, 2018, Berry, who was due to become a restricted free agent, signed a one-year contract extension with the Steelers.

On March 13, 2019, Berry signed a two-year contract extension with the Steelers.

On September 7, 2020, Berry was released by the Steelers after the team signed Dustin Colquitt. He was re-signed on October 24, 2020.

Berry signed another one-year contract with the Steelers on March 29, 2021. He was released on August 26, 2021, after losing the starting job to rookie Pressley Harvin III.

Minnesota Vikings
On September 2, 2021, Berry signed a one-year deal worth $990,000 with the Minnesota Vikings. He re-signed with the team on March 16, 2022. He was released on August 25, 2022.

Pittsburgh Steelers (second stint)
On September 27, 2022, Berry was signed to the Steelers practice squad. He was released on October 4.

Personal life
Berry's younger brother Wilson plays as a punter at the University of Kentucky starting in the 2021 season.

See also
 Australians in American football

References

External links
Pittsburgh Steelers bio
Eastern Kentucky Colonels bio

1991 births
Living people
People from Essendon, Victoria
Sportsmen from Victoria (Australia)
American football punters
Australian players of American football
Eastern Kentucky Colonels football players
Pittsburgh Steelers players
Minnesota Vikings players
People educated at Melbourne High School
Sportspeople from Melbourne
Australian expatriate sportspeople in the United States